Tales of a GrassWidow, sometimes stylized as Tales of a Grasswidow, is the fifth studio album by American musical group CocoRosie. It was released by independent record labels City Slang and Republic of Music on May 27, 2013 in the United Kingdom and May 28, 2013 in the United States. The album's sound has been described as "indie pop" and "indie folk".

Critical reception

Tales of a GrassWidow received generally positive reviews. At Metacritic, which assigns a weighted average score out of 100 to reviews from mainstream critics, the album received an average score of 75, based on 18 reviews, indicating "generally favorable reviews". 

The Guardian'''s Phil Mongredien gave the album a rating of 3 out of 5 stars, praising the versatility of Bianca Casady's vocals ("at times childlike, an instant later carrying the emotional heft of Billie Holiday") but stating that "too much of the material … is content to merely sit in the background, not something from which they usually suffer". In a review for music blog GoldFlakePaint, Lee Adcock stated that Tales of a GrassWidow's best moments "are its most minimal ones", describing the track "Broken Chariot" as the "most captivating" and "only intimate" track on the album, and suggesting that while "the production is even crisper" and the "techno beats are even more prominent", much of the album is "crowded with incongruous ideas" and "just snatches of abstract poetry, all striking at certain verses, but perplexing when strung together".

In a review for Pitchfork, assigning the album a rating of 6.7 out of 10, Brian Howe described Tales of a GrassWidow'' as "remarkably straightforward" and "remarkably pleasant" in comparison to CocoRosie's previous records, noting the "practical songwriting, with refreshingly natural vocals and themes that tend toward the soapy and sentimental". Howe praised the "sleek Valgeir Sigurðsson production", the "juiced-up piano and synth bounce" of the track "After the Afterlife", the "velvety Mesoamerican flutes" of the track "Broken Chariot", and the "folksy … cracked brightness" of the track "Roots of My Hair", opining that the album "feels like a long-held transgressive impulse spending its last momentum, beneficially redirecting energy into more direct emotional appeals".

Track listing

*Not to be confused with the track "Tearz for Animals", featuring British singer Anonhi, from CocoRosie's 2012 double-sided single "We Are On Fire".

Personnel
Credits adapted from liner notes.

 CocoRosie – performance, production, recording, artwork
 Gael Rakotondrabe – arrangement (1, 5, 10), piano (1, 5, 6), keyboards (1, 5, 10), synthesizer (1, 5), guitar (5), organ (10)
 Antony Hegarty – vocals (2, 11)
 Tez – human beatbox (2, 5, 7, 8, 10)
 Valgeir Sigurðsson – drum programming (2, 7, 8, 9, 11), production, recording
 Ashok Foga – vocals (3), drums (3)
 Mahipai Foga – castanet (3)
 Kusumakar – bamboo flute (3, 4)
 Ashley "Say Wut?!" Moyer – human beatbox (6), vocals (9)
 Finnbogi Petursson – tones (8, 11)
 Ezekiel Healy – guitar (9)
 Nico Kalwill – additional production, engineering, mixing
 Paul Evans – additional recording
 Jon Trier Ottossen – engineering assistance
 Scott Hull – mastering
 Jean-Marc Ruellan – layout
 Jesse Hazelip – lettering

Charts

References

External links
 

2013 albums
CocoRosie albums
City Slang albums
Albums produced by Valgeir Sigurðsson